The Frederick Keys are a collegiate summer baseball team of the MLB Draft League. The Keys are based in Frederick, Maryland. The franchise is named for "Star-Spangled Banner" writer Francis Scott Key, a native of Frederick County. A new team mascot "Frank Key", short for Francis Scott Key, joined the current mascot, a coyote named Keyote, at the beginning of the 2011 baseball season. The Keys were purchased from Maryland Baseball Holding, LLC by Attain Sports and Entertainment in January 2022. Home games are played at Harry Grove Stadium.

Prior to Major League Baseball's reorganization of the minor leagues following the 2020 season, the Keys were a Minor League Baseball team that served as the Class A-Advanced affiliate of the Baltimore Orioles from 1989 to 2020.

Early professional baseball in Frederick
Frederick was one of the founding members of the Blue Ridge League, which existed from 1915 to 1930. The team, which went by the names of Hustlers, Champs and Warriors, won league championships in 1915 and 1921. Games were played at the Frederick Fairgrounds until 1924 when McCurdy Field was built. With the collapse of the Blue Ridge League in 1931, it would be several decades before professional baseball returned to Frederick.

Frederick players from this era who were major leaguers:

 Clyde Barnhart: 1915, 1916, 1917
 Tom Connolly: 1915
 Bill Lamar: 1915
 Leo Meyer: 1916
 Tom Crooke: 1917
 Clarence Blethen: 1920, 1921, 1922, 1923
 Ray Gardner: 1920, 1922, 1923, 1925
 Ray Hartranft: 1920
 Duke Sedgwick: 1922
 Jim Keesey: 1923
 Norm McNeil: 1923
 Bobby Schang: 1923
 Chick Fullis: 1924, 1925, 1926
 Karl Kolseth: 1924
 Bill Hohman: 1924
 Rollie Hemsley: 1925, 1926, 1927
 Larry Boerner:1926
 Jimmie DeShong:1928
 Joe Vosmik:  1929
 Milt Galatzer: 1930
 Bill Perrin: 1930

Debut
The team was founded in 1989 when the Baltimore Orioles decided to move their Class A affiliate from Hagerstown, Maryland. The city of Frederick convinced the owners of the then-Hagerstown Suns to move the team to Frederick and promised a 4,000-seat stadium to be built for the 1990 season. For the 1989 season, the Keys played at McCurdy Field, a Babe Ruth League stadium, while waiting for the construction of the new stadium to be completed. The Keys opened by losing both ends of a doubleheader (including a seven-inning perfect game by Dennis Burlingame) against the Durham Bulls. Their first win came on April 11, 1989, with a 3–1 victory over the Kinston Indians in the Keys' first-ever home game.

Only two players in Keys history have been transferred directly from Frederick to the Baltimore Orioles (excluding rehab related transfers). On September 3, 1996, Eugene Kingsale's contract was purchased by the Orioles. On June 11, 2005, Jeff Fiorentino's contract was purchased by the Orioles in order to replace the injured Luis Matos.

The Keys have played in the Carolina League Championship Series, the Mills Cup Series, five times.  Four series were against the Kinston Indians, while the series in 2007 was against the Salem Avalanche.  They won their first series in 1990, defeating the Indians three games to two.   They won their second cup in the 2005 season, defeating Kinston three games to two at historic Grainger Stadium in the best of five series. They were swept by the Indians in 2006, 3 games to 0. They won the 2007 series against the Salem Avalanche three games to one.  They defeated Kinston in the 2011 series three games to one.

Playoff history
1990: Defeated Kinston 3–2 to win championship.
1993: Lost to Wilmington 2–0 in semifinals.
1997: Lost to Lynchburg 2–0 in semifinals.
2000: Lost to Lynchburg 2–0 in semifinals.
2001: Lost to Wilmington 2–0 in semifinals.
2005: Defeated Lynchburg 2–0 in semifinals; defeated Kinston 3–2 to win championship.
2006: Defeated Wilmington 2–1 in semifinals; lost to Kinston 3–0 in finals.
2007: Defeated Wilmington 2–0 in semifinals; defeated Salem 3–1 to win championship.
2010: Lost to Potomac 3–1 in semifinals.
2011: Defeated Potomac 3–2 in semifinals; defeated Kinston 3–1 to win championship.
2017: Lost to Lynchburg 2–1 in semifinals.

Notable former Keys
Several Keys alumni have gone on to play in the major leagues. In their inaugural season, the opening day roster featured several future major leaguers: David Segui, Francisco de la Rosa, Luis Mercedes, Jack Voigt, and Pete Rose Jr.

Other Keys alumni include:

 Andy Van Slyke: 1995
 Arthur Rhodes: 1989, 1990
 Joe Borowski: 1989, 1990
 Sidney Ponson: 1996
 Brian Roberts: 2000
 Larry Bigbie: 2000
 Tim Raines Jr.: 2000
 Eli Whiteside: 2002
 Nick Markakis: 2005
 Adam Loewen: 2005
 Nolan Reimold: 2006
 Matt Wieters: 2008
 Brad Bergesen: 2009
 Manny Machado: 2011
 Dylan Bundy: 2012
 Nicky Delmonico: 2012
 Ty Kelly: 2012
 Jason Hammel: 2012
 Kevin Gausman: 2012
 Steve Pearce: 2013
 Josh Stinson: 2013
 Ashur Tolliver: 2013
 Wilson Betemit: 2013
 Ryan Flaherty: 2013
 Zach Davies: 2013
 Mike Yastrzemski: 2014
 Jimmy Yacabonis: 2014
 Austin Wynns: 2014
 Trey Mancini: 2014
 Parker Bridwell: 2014
 Steven Brault: 2014
 Mychal Givens: 2014
 Chance Sisco: 2015
 Jonathan Schoop: 2015
 John Means: 2015
 Stefan Crichton: 2015
 Wei-Yin Chen: 2015
 David Lough: 2015
 David Hess: 2015

Roster

References

External links
 
 Statistics from Baseball-Reference

Carolina League teams
Baseball teams established in 1989
1989 establishments in Maryland
Sports in Frederick, Maryland
MLB Draft League teams